Minning is a town under the administration of Yongning County, Ningxia, China. , it administers Funing Community and the following six villages:
Funing Village
Mulan Village
Wuhe Village
Yuanyi Village
Yuhai Village
Yuanlong Village

Minning, which literally means "Fujian–Ningxia", was named by Xi Jinping in 1997, then deputy secretary of the Fujian Provincial Party Committee and the leader of the Fujian-Ningxia poverty-alleviation leading group. The town was officially established in 2001 after its population swelled to 14,000. Most of its residents are resettled farmers from Xihaigu in southern Ningxia, one of the poorest places in China and a main target of the government's poverty-alleviation resettlement program.

The 2021 TV series Minning Town is based on the history of this town. Starring Huang Xuan, Zu Feng, Rayzha Alimjan, Zhang Jiayi, Huang Yao, Bai Yufan, Guo Jingfei, You Yongzhi, Yao Chen, Huang Jue, Tao Hong, Yan Ni with Wang Kai and Bai Yu, the show was a huge critical success and described as "a new standard for Chinese dramas". It won Best Television Series and three other awards at the 2021 Shanghai Television Festival.

NCPA commissioned an opera of the same name premiered September 2022.

References 

Township-level divisions of Ningxia
Yongning County
2001 establishments in China